The 2015 TNM Super League was the 30th season of the Super League of Malawi, the top professional league for association football clubs in Malawi since its establishment in 1986. It started on 18 April 2015 and ended on 24 December 2015. Nyasa Big Bullets successfully defended their title, winning the twelfth Super League title.

Teams 
Fifteen teams compete in this season: the top twelve teams from the previous season and three promoted teams from the regional leagues. Dedza Young Soccer (Central Region Football League), Surestream Academy (Southern Region Football League) and Mzuni FC (Northern Region Football League) entered as the three promoted teams, instead of the three relegated teams from previous season, Blantyre United, Chikwawa United and Karonga United.
Other changes
 Surestream Academy, was renamed during the season as FISD Wizards.

League table

References

External links
Official Website

2015
Premier League
Malawi